Vazhi Pizhacha Santhathi is a 1968 Indian Malayalam-language film, directed and produced by O. Ramdas. The film stars Sathyan, Madhu, Kaviyoor Ponnamma and Adoor Bhasi. The film had musical score by B. A. Chidambaranath.

Cast

Sathyan
Madhu
Kaviyoor Ponnamma
Adoor Bhasi
Thikkurissy Sukumaran Nair
Muthukulam Raghavan Pillai
Sankaradi
T. R. Omana
Ambika
C. I. Paul
K. P. Ummer
Kamaladevi
M. Parameswaran
M. S. Namboothiri
Prathapan

Soundtrack
The music was composed by B. A. Chidambaranath and the lyrics were written by P. Bhaskaran.

References

External links
 

1968 films
1960s Malayalam-language films